Formula Asia V6 Renault, renamed Formula V6 Asia in 2007 by Motorsport Asia, was launched in 2006 and regulated by Motorsport Asia. It was a Formula Renault 3.5 that include also World Series by Renault and the former Formula Renault V6 Eurocup.

For the first time, Southeast Asian-based drivers were able to progress from karting, through the ranks of junior single seaters, and step up to a programme specifically designed to groom them for the pinnacle of international motorsport.

This Series was the latest addition to the Championships already organised by Motorsport Asia, namely the Asian Touring Car Championship, Formula BMW Asia and the Porsche Carrera Cup Asia in the region's leading motorsport event, the Asian Festival of Speed.

The first championship, in 2006, was won by Indian driver Karun Chandhok, who beat fellow Asians Ananda Mikola and Hanss Lin to win the title. The crowned driver was rewarded with a test in a World Series by Renault car at Paul Ricard.

The series was presumed to be defunct after the 2009 season, which was cut short after just two race meetings, and subsequently no information has been given by the organisers of the series.

Races program
Each venue include two races:
The Super Sprint with rolling start between 60 and 90 km, and over a maximum racing duration of 30 min. 
The Grand Race with standing start between 100 and 130 km, and over a maximum racing duration of 45 min.

Point system:

In each race, 1 point is allowed for pole position.
Drivers completed fewer than 90% of the race distance will not score points.

Cars

The series ran with Tatuus chassis carbon monocoque and a Nissan-sourced 3.5 L V6 engine. Michelin is the tyres supplier.

 Engine : Renault Type V4Y RS, 60° V6, 3498 cc, 370 hp
 Chassis : Tatuus Carbon-fibre Monocoque, carbon and fibreglass bodywork
 Width : 1850 mm (72.8") maximum
 Wheelbase : 3000 mm
 Track : 1579 mm (front) and 1536 mm (rear)
 Weight: 590 kg
 Fuel : 90 litres
 Suspension front and rear with torsion bar, push-rod, twin struts
 Telemetry, and steering wheel
 Sequential manual transmission, six gears
 Wheels : Single piece magnesium with central nut, 10 x 13 (front) and 13 x 13 (rear)
 Tyres : Michelin dry and rain, 24 x 57 x 13 (front) and 31 x 60 x 13 (rear)

Champions

References

External links
 Formula V6 Asia official website
 Motorsport Asia official website
 Complete regulations – ( )

 
Recurring sporting events established in 2006
Recurring sporting events disestablished in 2009